Friul Intagli Industries S.P.A. is an Italian multinational company founded in 1968 by Inaco Maccan, current owner and It is a part of the Maccan Group.
Friul Intagli Industries, is the largest furniture component manufacturer in the World, with over 50 years experience industry supplying the biggest names in Europe as well as the US, such as IKEA, their main client. Their markets include kitchens, bathrooms, bedrooms, home office, children's furniture and entertainment furniture for residential and commercial buildings as well as cruises and ships. It is headquartered in Pordenone with other work sites in the biggest capitals of Europe, America and Russia.

History
Inaco Maccan R founded Friul Intagli in 1968 at the age of 20 years. He wanted to create his own productive activity, differently from the market of those times, providing furniture components rather than finished products.
In 1979 was founded the second company of the Group, ERREGIEMME SpA, for the production of veneer frames, later incorporated into the Friul Intagli.
The philosophy that drives the company is to provide to the customers not only quality products, but also on time.
Punctuality, as well as the order and cleanliness are sculpted features in the DNA of the company; care, attention to detail, have consolidated the image of Friul Intagli as a serious and solid company all over the World.

Friul Intagli provides furnitures and services to hotels, cruises, residential and community spaces.

Today the covered surface area of Friul Intagli occupies 3.000.000 sq feet, with over 2.500 employees and an annual revenue over US$950 million

See also 

List of Italian companies

Manufacturing companies established in 1968
Furniture companies of Italy
Pordenone
Italian companies established in 1968